Expo/Bundy station is an elevated light rail station in the Los Angeles County Metro Rail system.  It is located at the intersection of Bundy Drive and Exposition Boulevard in West Los Angeles, California.  It serves the Metro E Line.

Service

Station layout 

This station is in West Los Angeles, on an elevated structure spanning Bundy Drive, just south of Olympic Boulevard. The area is a busy commercial center, with heavy traffic on nearby boulevards partly due to the two major freeways nearby.  Directly to the west (across Centinela) is the proposed site of the Expo Vehicle Maintenance Facility.

The elevated station structure stands 30 feet above Bundy Drive. To the east, the track descends a retained fill embankment before crossing Barrington Avenue.  To the west, the track descends a retained fill embankment after crossing Centinela Avenue.

Parking is located at-grade in the right-of-way near the station.

Hours and frequency

Connections 
, the following connections are available:
 Big Blue Bus (Santa Monica): 5, 7, Rapid 7, Rapid 10, 14, 15

References

 Curbed Staff (November 24, 2014) "Expo Line Extension is 80 Percent Done; See the New Stations" Curbed Los Angeles Retrieved on December 2, 2016.

E Line (Los Angeles Metro) stations
West Los Angeles
Railway stations in Los Angeles
Railway stations in the United States opened in 2016
2016 establishments in California
Pacific Electric stations